French expedition in Syria may refer to:
French campaign in Egypt and Syria (1798–1801), Napoleon's campaign
French intervention in the 1860 civil conflict in Mount Lebanon and Damascus
Franco-Syrian War (1920), the establishment of the French mandate

See also
Crusades